Red Cross Society of Niger also known as RCN was founded in 1963.  It has its headquarters in Niamey.  It is a part of the International Red Cross and Red Crescent Movement.

External links
ICRC Profile

Niger
Niamey
1963 establishments in Niger
Organizations established in 1963
Medical and health organisations based in Niger